The United States Penitentiary, Victorville, CA (USP Victorville) is a high-security United States federal prison for male inmates in California. It is part of the Federal Correctional Complex, Victorville (FCC Victorville) and is operated by the Federal Bureau of Prisons, a division of the United States Department of Justice.

History
USP Victorville, opened on October 21, 2004 as a high-security prison which cost $101.4 million. It was constructed by Hensel Phelps Construction Company of Irvine, California and the Crosby Group Design Firm of Redwood City, California. The security systems were designed by Buford Goff and Associates of Columbia, South Carolina.

Facility
Six V-shaped buildings (units 1–3 on east side, units 4–6 on west side) facing each other and a larger maintenance building surround a central yard with a tower in the middle. Six additional towers are lined along the rectangular-shaped facility. The facility is surrounded by a lethal electrical double fence, a  brickstone wall on its northern side and a view protection fence on its western side. Cells are usually occupied by two inmates and are air-conditioned. The administrative and disciplinary unit (SHU) can hold 238 inmates. Cells in the disciplinary unit have showers and are occupied by three inmates when overcrowding occurs (one inmate is forced to sleep on the floor in such cases).

Inmate life
Prisoners have access to the text-based e-mail program known as TRULINCS (Trust Fund Limited Inmate Communication System). Prisoners are allowed only 13,000 characters per e-mail, and attachments cannot be sent, received, or viewed. Inmates are not allowed to retain more than two newspapers, 10 magazines and 25 letters in their cells. They are allowed to place phone calls to up to 30 approved numbers. Phone calls are restricted to 15 minutes per call and five hours per month. Inmates pay for their phone calls through their trust accounts. Inmates can buy additional food, hygiene articles and clothes from commissary for a maximum of $290 a month.

Inmates are counted 5 to 6 times a day at 12:01 a.m., 3:00 a.m., 5:00 a.m., 4:00 p.m. (stand-up count), 10:00 p.m. and 10:00 a.m. (on weekends and holidays). Initial work movements start at 4:30 a.m. and inmates must be up at 7:30 a.m. All inmates must be back to their cells at 10:00 p.m.

Notable incidents
On April 11, 2005, USP Victorville inmate Scott Fischer (who used several aliases including Peter Steven Scopazzi, the name on his prison death certificate) was fatally slashed by another inmate, reportedly over a dispute regarding less than $10.00 worth of tobacco.

USP Victorville inmate Tony Richard Padilla died at Arrowhead Regional Medical Center on August 12, 2006, from injuries sustained during a fight with another inmate.

On the afternoon of May 13, 2009, several inmates at USP Victorville attacked inmate Gregory Francis Ritter of Waikiki, Hawaii, who was serving a 33-month sentence for drug and weapons possession, according to the San Bernardino County Sheriff's Department. Ritter was transported to a local hospital by ambulance and later flown to Arrowhead Regional Medical Center in critical condition. Ritter died of his injuries at 7:13 p.m.

On October 1, 2013, inmate Javier Sanders was found beaten to death in his cell. Sanders was serving a 10-year sentence for federal drug crimes. Fifty-three-year-old David Snow, the former president of the Aryan Brotherhood of Ohio, was found beaten to death on November 13, 2013 (Snow had been convicted in 2005 of possession of a firearm and 50 tablets of oxycodone and had been sentenced to 180 months' confinement.). The next day, 40-year-old David Serra was found dead in what was determined to be a suicide. Serra had been at the prison for only five months, and was serving a 30-year sentence for second-degree murder and deadly use of a firearm.

On June 21, 2014, two inmates were found dead in the prison. The deaths were quickly ruled homicides, and the victims were later identified as 24-year-old Brian Kountz and 49-year-old Robert Howard Ferguson. In 2013, Kountz had been sentenced in Wyoming to 80 months in prison for an armed robbery. Ferguson had been sentenced the same year in Las Vegas, Nevada, to 80 months in prison for being a felon in possession of a firearm. Three days later, news outlets reported that 48-year-old Daniel Casto (60992-065) of Sweet Home, Oregon, had been identified as a suspect and placed in a restricted housing unit within USP Victorville. Casto is currently being held at the United States Penitentiary, Florence ADX, a high-security federal prison in Colorado, with a release date in 2031.

Serious incidents of violence at federal prisons are investigated by the FBI.

Notable inmates (current and former)
†The Sentencing Reform Act of 1984 eliminated parole for federal inmates. However, inmates sentenced for offenses committed prior to 1987 are eligible for parole consideration.

High-profile inmates

Gang leaders

Others

See also

 List of United States federal prisons
 Federal Bureau of Prisons
 Incarceration in the United States

References

External links
 Federal Bureau of Prisons.gov: Official United States Penitentiary−USP Victorville website
 Federal Bureau of Prisons.gov: FCC Victorville complex website

Buildings and structures in San Bernardino County, California
Victorville
Prisons in California
Victor Valley
Victorville, California
Government buildings completed in 2004
2004 establishments in California